Punti Kayu Station (formerly Telkom Station) is a station of the Palembang LRT Line 1. The station is located between  station and  station.

The station was opened on 24 September 2018, after the 2018 Asian Games had concluded.

Station layout

References

Palembang
Railway stations in South Sumatra
Railway stations opened in 2018